The Commissioner for Public Appointments is a British public servant, appointed by The King, whose primary role is to provide independent assurance that ministerial public appointments across the United Kingdom by HM Government Ministers (and devolved appointments by Welsh Government Ministers) are made in accordance with the Principles of Public Appointments and the Cabinet Office's Governance Code on Public Appointments.   The Commissioner issues an annual report and a statistical bulletin each year.

There are similar bodies for two other jurisdictions of the United Kingdom – the Commissioner for Ethical Standards in Public Life in Scotland and the Office of the Commissioner for Public Appointments for Northern Ireland.

, the current Commissioner for Public Appointments is William Shawcross.

List of Commissioners for Public Appointments in England and Wales 
 November 1995–March 1999: Sir Len Peach
 March 1999–December 2005: Dame Rennie Fritchie DBE (now The Baroness Fritchie)
 January 2006–December 2010: Dame Janet Gaymer DBE
 January 2011–March 2016: Sir David Normington GCB
 April 2016–September 2021: Rt Hon Peter Riddell CBE
 September 2021–: William Shawcross CVO

References

External links 
 The Commissioner for Public Appointments' website

Public bodies and task forces of the United Kingdom government
 
1995 establishments in the United Kingdom